The Ohio Valley Conference (OVC) is a collegiate athletic conference which operates in the Midwestern and Southeastern United States. It participates in Division I of the NCAA; the conference's football programs compete in the Football Championship Subdivision (FCS; formerly known as Division I-AA), the lower of two levels of Division I football competition. The OVC has 10 members, six of which compete in football in the conference.

History
Primary source:
The Ohio Valley Conference can trace its roots to 1941 when Murray State athletic director Roy Stewart, Eastern Kentucky athletic director Charles "Turkey" Hughes, and Western Kentucky public relations director Kelly Thompson first formulated the idea of establishing a regional athletics conference. The plan was put on hold due to World War II, but it was resurrected after the conclusion of the war.  In 1948, the three schools joined with Louisville, Morehead State, and Evansville to form the Ohio Valley Conference.  While many collegiate conferences are struggling today with the question of whether their policies and rules should be determined by the athletic departments or by the institutional heads, from the very beginning, the OVC has been run by the presidents of its member schools.

Historically, the OVC was a pioneer in racial desegregation, with Morehead State signing the conference's first Black athlete, Marshall Banks, in 1958. The rest of the OVC soon followed in Morehead State's wake. From 1986 to 2018, the OVC was unique among NCAA Division I conferences in that it included one historically Black university, Tennessee State University, in a conference that otherwise consists of institutions that are not traditionally Black. During this period, every other HBCU in NCAA Division I belonged to either the Mid-Eastern Athletic Conference or Southwestern Athletic Conference. That distinction changed when both Hampton University and North Carolina A&T State University joined the Big South Conference in 2018 and 2021, respectively; both schools have since joined the Colonial Athletic Association.

The OVC has also been a leader in advancement of sports opportunities for women. The conference began adding championship competitions for women in 1977 several years after the AIAW began sponsoring national championships for women, but seven years before the NCAA was ready to move into the field.  Since 2009, the OVC has been led by Commissioner Beth DeBauche, one of only six female commissioners for the thirty-two Division I conferences.

Athletic rivalries, really close colleges and especially when competitors are in relatively close proximity, can generate problems with fan behavior, and the conference leadership struggled with controlling the issue for many years.  When the national debate on the problem reached its apex in the mid-1990s, the OVC unveiled the national first of its kind "Sportsmanship Statement" in 1995, stating the conference's policy on, "... principles of fair play, ethical conduct and respect for one's opponent."  Since then, the OVC has also introduced individual, team (for each sport), and institutional sportsmanship awards.

Founded by six schools, the expansions of 2007 and 2011 brought the Ohio Valley Conference membership to twelve schools, the most in its history. The OVC dropped to 10 members after the 2020–21 school year, when founding member Eastern Kentucky and Jacksonville State left for the ASUN Conference. At that time, the OVC was searching for teams to replace both.

The OVC lost three more members after the 2021–22 school year. Football-sponsoring Austin Peay left for the ASUN Conference, which ultimately launched its own football league in 2022. Non-football Belmont left for the Missouri Valley Conference. Another football school, founding member Murray State, left for the MVC. When announcing its move to the MVC, Murray State announced that it was seeking membership in the football-only Missouri Valley Football Conference, and also announced that it would continue to house its rifle team in the OVC. In a separate statement, Murray State's president indicated that the football team would remain in the OVC in the 2022 season, ensuring that the OVC would retain its automatic bid to the FCS playoffs in that season and giving the league more time to add new football members. Murray State would eventually be accepted by the MVFC effective in 2023.

Also in July 2022, the OVC added two non-football members in the University of Arkansas at Little Rock, athletically known as Little Rock, and the University of Southern Indiana, which started a transition from NCAA Division II, plus a new football-sponsoring member in Lindenwood University, also transitioning from D-II.

According to a report from Matt Brown of the Extra Points college sports blog, the OVC expected to lose Murray State, and was considering multiple expansion candidates, with Southern Indiana among them. Other schools named by Brown's sources as possible candidates were FCS programs Arkansas–Pine Bluff and Western Illinois, plus potential Division II upgraders Grand Valley State, Hillsdale, and Lincoln Memorial.

On February 22, 2022, the conference announced its intent to combine its football membership with the Big South Conference beginning in 2023. Full details of the alliance, specifically whether it will be operated by either the Big South or OVC, or become a completely separate entity, have yet to be announced.

Shortly after the 2022 membership changes took effect, the OVC and the Horizon League jointly announced that they would merge their men's tennis leagues under the Horizon banner, effective immediately. All five OVC members that sponsored men's tennis became Horizon affiliates in that sport.

OVC Digital Network
In August 2012, the OVC announced that it had launched the OVC Digital Network as a replacement for and improvement over the conference's former efforts to provide streaming video coverage of many athletic events that had been in place since 2006. This website carried live, student-produced coverage of most conference games and some non-conference games in baseball, men's and women's basketball, football, soccer, softball, and volleyball as well as some coaches' shows, special presentations, and archived game-casts available for later viewing.

In its first two years, the network provided well over 600,000 viewings of streamed live video of more than 1400 events.

In the 2018–20 school year the coverage previously carried on the OVC Digital Network was switched over to ESPN+.

Member schools

Full members

Notes

Affiliate members
Years listed in this table are calendar years. For schools that play only spring sports (such as beach volleyball) in the OVC, the calendar year of arrival precedes the first season of competition.

Former members

Notes

Former affiliate members

Notes

Membership timeline

Comments
 Morehead State's football team competes in the Pioneer Football League, a Division I FCS football-only conference whose members choose not to offer athletic scholarships for football.
 Austin Peay's football team left the OVC after the 1996 season to compete as an NCAA D-I FCS Independent. After four seasons as an Independent, the team joined the Pioneer Football League in 2001, and remained there through the 2005 season. Austin Peay then returned to scholarship football, spending the 2006 season as an Independent before re-entering OVC football competition in 2007.

Conference divisions
Starting with the 2012–13 school year, the twelve member schools were split into two divisions for those sports where all schools competed. In the 2014–15 season, women's sports with twelve teams returned to a single league table, while continuing to play a divisional schedule. Men's basketball moved to an 18-game schedule in 2017–18, and they continued to play home-and-home versus the former divisional rivals, and they play home-and-home versus two teams from the other division, with those opponents on a rotation that sets up different pairs from year-to-year. The OVC returned to a single-table format after Eastern Kentucky and Jacksonville State left in 2021.

Sports offered
The Ohio Valley Conference currently offers championship competition in 18 NCAA sanctioned sports, with seven for men, 10 for women, and rifle for men's, women's, and coed teams.

Men's sponsored sports by school

Notes

Men's varsity sports not sponsored by the Ohio Valley Conference which are played by OVC schools

Notes

Women's sponsored sports by school

Women's varsity sports not sponsored by the Ohio Valley Conference which are played by OVC schools

Conference champions

Football conference champions

This is a list of the champions since 2010. For the complete history, see List of Ohio Valley Conference football champions.

$ – Tennessee Tech won the tie-breaker and received the automatic bid to the FCS playoffs.

$$ – Austin Peay won the tie-breaker and received the automatic bid to the FCS Playoffs

Basketball
This is list of the champions since 2010. For the complete men's history, see List of Ohio Valley Conference men's basketball champions.

Baseball
This is list of the champions since 2010.

 # = 2009 Eastern Illinois lost 1 conference and 4 non-conference games by forfeit for using an ineligible player.

Softball
This is list of the champions since 2010.

Women's soccer
This is a list of Champions since 2010.

Facilities
Departing members in red; future members in gray.

See also
List of American collegiate athletic stadiums and arenas

References

External links
 

 
Sports in the Midwestern United States
Sports in the Southern United States
Sports organizations established in 1948
Articles which contain graphical timelines
1948 establishments in the United States